Oudemolen ("Old mill"), Oude Molen or De Oude Molen may refer to:-

Places
Oudemolen, Drenthe
Oudemolen, North Brabant
Oude Molen, North Brabant, a village in North Brabant
Oude Molen, a village in Overijssel
Oude-Molen, a hamlet in South Holland

Windmills
In Belgium
Oude Molen, Aalter, a windmill in East Flanders
Oude Molen, Betekorn, a windmill in Flemish Brabant
Oude Molen, Hekelgem, a windmill in Flemish Brabant
Oude Molen, Keerbergen, a windmill in Flemish Brabant
Oude Molen, Knokke, a windmill in West Flanders
Oude Molen, Oostkerke, a windmill in West Flanders
Oude Molen, Tessenderlo, a windmill in Limburg

In the Netherlands

De Oude Molen, Colijnsplaat, a windmill in Zeeland
De Oude Molen, Kruiningen, a windmill in Zeeland
De Oude Molen, Oudemolen, a windmill in North Brabant
De Oude Molen, Wijchen, a windmill in Gelderland
De Oude Molen, Winterswijk, a windmill in Gelderland

In South Africa
Oude Molen, Cape Town, a tower mill in South Africa

Watermills 
Oude Molen, Simpelveld, former watermill and Dutch national monument in Simpelveld

Distillery
Oude Molen Distillery in South Africa

See also
Alde Swarte Molen, Easterlittens, a windmill in Friesland